31 May District is a district in Hargeisa, Somaliland. It is one of the eight administrative districts of Hargeisa City.
May 31, 2001 is the date that the Somali National Movement attacked Hargeisa in 1988.

See also
Administrative divisions of Somaliland
Regions of Somaliland
Districts of Somaliland

References

Districts of Hargeisa